A nervous system neoplasm is a tumor affecting the nervous system.  Types include:
 Nerve sheath tumor
 Brain tumor
 Arachnoid cyst
 Optic nerve glioma

References

External links

Nervous system neoplasia